Alexander J. McGoldrick is an Australian author and a former public servant and diplomat. He was Australian Ambassador to Saudi Arabia from 1988 to 1991, during the Gulf War.

Life and career
McGoldrick was born in Ballarat. He graduated from the Australian National University.

In the late 1970s, McGoldrick was a first assistance secretary in the Department of Overseas Trade. In 1980, McGoldrick was appointed Senior Trade Commissioner in Brussels.

Between 1985 and 1988 McGoldrick was Australia's Ambassador to the Organisation for Economic Co-operation and Development in Paris. He took up an appointment as Ambassador to Saudi Arabia in 1988. His posting in Riyadh until 1991 included the duration of the Gulf War. In 1989 McGoldrick took part in negotiations regarding the live export trade after Saudi Arabia rejected five shiploads of Australian live sheep.

McGoldrick self-published his book A Memoir of Arabia in 2010. The book offers an account of the time he spent in the Middle East during the Gulf War. In 2011 it was highly commended by judges for the ACT Writers Centre awards.

Literary works

References

Year of birth missing (living people)
People from Ballarat
Living people
Australian writers
Ambassadors of Australia to Saudi Arabia
Ambassadors of Australia to the United Arab Emirates
Australian National University alumni